Winnetka is a station on Metra's Union Pacific North Line located in Winnetka, Illinois. In Metra's zone-based fare structure, Winnetka is in zone D. As of 2018, Winnetka is the 68th busiest of Metra's 236 non-downtown stations, with an average of 754 weekday boardings.

Winnetka station is located in a below-grade trench. The platforms are accessible via stairs from Elm and Oak Streets and a passenger bridge. An elevator for handicapped access is also located on the passenger bridge. The station consists of two side platforms which serve two tracks. A station house is located at street level; the station house is open from 5:15 A.M. to 1:15 P.M., and tickets are sold on weekdays. Parking is available in a lot adjacent to the station house. The Green Bay Trail, a hiking and bicycle trail, runs east of and parallel to the railroad tracks at Winnetka and can be accessed from the inbound platform.

As of April 25, 2022, Winnetka is served by all 35 trains in each direction on weekdays, by all 13 trains in each direction on Saturdays, and by all nine trains in each direction on Sundays. On weekdays, seven outbound trains terminate at Winnetka, and six inbound trains originate from this station.

Winnetka was originally built at grade level when it served the Chicago and North Western Railway. As an increasing amount of railroad traffic came through Winnetka, the railroad crossings became unsafe, and 29 people had been killed at railroad crossings by 1937 despite safety efforts by the city and the railroad. After the deaths of two prominent Winnetka women at the Pine Street crossing on October 20, 1937, Winnetkans demanded that the grade crossings be removed. The city elected to put the tracks in a below-grade trench to avoid dividing the city with an elevated railroad. With the help of funding from the Public Works Administration, the tracks were lowered into a trench by 1943. Winnetka and  stations were located at street level with access to station platforms by stairs from a pedestrian walkway across the tracks, and  became an elevated station.

Bus connections
Pace
 213 Green Bay Road 
 423 Linden CTA/The Glen/Harlem CTA

References

External links

Oak Street entrance from Google Maps Street View
Elm Street entrance from Google Maps Street View

Metra stations in Illinois
Former Chicago and North Western Railway stations
Winnetka, Illinois
Railway stations in Cook County, Illinois
Union Pacific North Line